Elections to Stevenage Council were held on 10 June 2004. One third of the council was up for election; the seats which were last contested in 2000. The Labour Party stayed in overall control of the council.

After the election, the composition of the council was:
Labour 32
Liberal Democrat 4
Conservative 3

Election result

Ward results

Bandley Hill

Bedwell

Chells

Longmeadow

Manor

Martins Wood

Old Town

Pin Green

Roebuck

St Nicholas

Shephall

Symonds Green

Woodfield

References
2004 Stevenage election result
Local Elections: Stevenage
Ward results

2004
2004 English local elections
2000s in Hertfordshire